Andrey Tissin (5 July 1975 – 1 March 2008) was a Russian sprint canoer who competed in the late 1990s and early 2000s (decade). He won four medals at the ICF Canoe Sprint World Championships with a gold (K-4 500 m: 2001), two silvers (K-4 200 m: 2001, K-4 500 m: 1999), and a bronze (K-4 500 m: 1998).

Tissin also competed in the K-2 1000 m event at the 1996 Summer Olympics in Atlanta, but was eliminated in the semifinals. He lived in Krasnodar, and was 1.86 m (6'1") tall, weighing 90 kg (198 lb).

Tissin later became a coach of the Russian national team, drowning during a training session in 2008.

References 

Utro.ru March 5, 2008 on Tissin's death 

1975 births
2008 deaths
Accidental deaths in Russia
Canoeists at the 1996 Summer Olympics
Deaths by drowning
Olympic canoeists of Russia
Russian male canoeists
ICF Canoe Sprint World Championships medalists in kayak